Clinton Mua N'Jie (born 15 August 1993) is a Cameroonian professional footballer who plays for Süper Lig club Sivasspor and the Cameroon national team. He is known for his pace and dribbling skills.

He started his career with Lyon, going up all the way from the youth program to the B squad and ultimately in the club's top tier squad in the French Ligue 1, before moving to Tottenham Hotspur of the Premier League, and then back to Ligue 1 side Marseille before moving to his current club.

N'Jie made his senior international debut for Cameroon in 2014 and represented the nation at the Africa Cup of Nations in 2015, 2017, 2019 and 2021, winning the 2017 tournament and finishing third in the 2021 tournament.

Club career

Lyon
N'Jie arrived at Lyon during the summer of 2011. He joined the under-19 squad and quickly progressed to the reserve squad along with Anthony Martial and Nabil Fekir, playing in the French 4th division. He played his first professional match during the 2012–13 season against Stade de Reims in a 3–0 win. N'Jie scored his first professional goal against Mladá Boleslav in the third qualifying round of the 2014–15 UEFA Europa League, helping his team to a 2–1 victory. On 13 August, he scored his first Ligue 1 goal in a 4–0 victory against Lorient. Earlier that day, he signed a three-year contract extension with Lyon through to 2019.
Having been shortlisted for the 2014 CAF Most Promising Talent of the Year, N'Jie lost out to Porto and Algeria midfielder Yacine Brahimi. He finished his first full season at Lyon with eight goals and seven assists in 33 appearances, despite only starting half of his 30 league games, as he was the third piece of the Lyon attacking line, with Nabil Fekir and Alexandre Lacazette. N'Jie also finished the season with a 73% shot-on-target ratio, second to only to Paris Saint-Germain's Zlatan Ibrahimović, who ended the campaign on 74%.

Tottenham Hotspur
On 15 August 2015, English side Tottenham Hotspur announced that the club had reached an agreement for the signing of N'Jie from Lyon, subject to international clearance and a work permit. N'Jie agreed to a five-year contract with a reported transfer fee of €12 million (£8.3 million). N'Jie made his Spurs debut on 17 September in a Europa League group stage match against Qarabağ, coming on as a substitute for Andros Townsend. On 10 December 2015, he tore his medial collateral ligament (MCL) after a challenge by Jérémy Toulalan during a Europa League group stage match against Monaco. He had to undergo knee surgery for the MCL tear and was expected to out of action for at least 1–2 months, and possibly longer. Working with injured teammate Jan Vertonghen during his recovery, N'Jie eventually made his return on 8 May 2016 in a Premier League match against Southampton, in what would be his final appearance of the season.

N'Jie made 8 appearances (all of them as a substitute) for Tottenham in the Premier League, his longest a 79-minute affair when he replaced the injured Nacer Chadli against Liverpool. In addition, N'Jie made 5 appearances, starting in 2 of them, in Tottenham's Europa League campaign, and did not score a goal in all competitions.

Marseille

On 31 August 2016, N'Jie returned to Ligue 1, joining Marseille on a season-long loan deal. Marseille had a €7 million option to buy him at the end of the loan, and Georges-Kévin Nkoudou headed to White Hart Lane on a permanent move in the opposite direction. On 11 September, he made his debut as a substitute for William Vainqueur in the 68th minute away to Nice, and he scored his first goal two weeks later to equalise in a 2–1 home win against Nantes.

On 16 July 2017, N'Jie made his move to Marseille permanent, signing for an undisclosed fee. On 6 August, in the season opener against Dijon, he came on at half time for injured captain Dimitri Payet and scored two goals in a 3–0 win. On 17 September, he scored both the goals in the away win over Amiens. On 3 May 2018, he played in the Europa League semi-finals away to FC Red Bull Salzburg as Marseille played out a 2–1 away loss but a 3–2 aggregate win to secure a place in the 2018 UEFA Europa League Final.

Dynamo Moscow
On 25 July 2019, N'Jie signed a four-year contract with Russian Premier League club Dynamo Moscow. He scored his first goal for Dynamo on 27 October 2019, a late winner in a 1–0 victory over PFC CSKA Moscow. N'Jie left Dynamo by mutual consent on 5 July 2022.

Sivasspor

On 29 July 2022, N'Jie signed with Sivasspor on a two-year contract.

International career

N'Jie scored 44 minutes into his Cameroon debut against the Democratic Republic of Congo on 6 September 2014, and followed this up four days later by scoring twice in a 4–1 victory over Ivory Coast at the Ahmadou Ahidjo Stadium in Yaoundé, Cameroon. He was named in the squad for the 2015 Africa Cup of Nations and played in one group stage match, coming on as a 67th-minute substitute in a 1–0 loss to Ivory Coast.
He won the 2017 Africa Cup of Nations. On Thursday, 3 February 2022, Clinton N'Jie would miss the last penalty against Egypt that would ultimately put Cameroon out of the 2021 Africa Cup of Nations and help Egypt secure a spot in the final against Senegal.

Style of play
N'Jie is a pacy forward who likes to play on the shoulder of the last defender, just off the front man. He can also play off the wing, and as dribbling is a key attribute of his game, he likes to take on players when given the chance. He frequently draws comparisons to Cameroon's all-time leading scorer and compatriot Samuel Eto'o, with this comparison being asserted by Lyon chairman Jean-Michel Aulas.

Career statistics

Club

International

International goals
Score and result list Cameroon's goal tally first.

Honours

Club
Lyon
Coupe de la Ligue runner-up: 2013–14

Marseille
UEFA Europa League runner-up: 2017–18

International
Cameroon
Africa Cup of Nations: 2017
Africa Cup of Nations third place: 2022

References

External links
 
 

1993 births
Living people
People from Buea
Cameroonian footballers
Olympique Lyonnais players
Tottenham Hotspur F.C. players
Olympique de Marseille players
FC Dynamo Moscow players
Sivasspor footballers
Ligue 1 players
Premier League players
Russian Premier League players
Süper Lig players
Cameroon international footballers
Association football forwards
Cameroonian expatriate footballers
Cameroonian expatriate sportspeople in England
Expatriate footballers in England
Expatriate footballers in France
Expatriate footballers in Russia
Cameroonian expatriate sportspeople in France
Expatriate footballers in Turkey
Cameroonian expatriate sportspeople in Turkey
2015 Africa Cup of Nations players
2017 Africa Cup of Nations players
2019 Africa Cup of Nations players
N'Jie
2021 Africa Cup of Nations players